Lee Woon-jae (born 26 April 1973) is a South Korean former football goalkeeper. He was part of South Korea's 1994, 2002, 2006 and 2010 FIFA World Cup campaigns. He was the only Asian player nominated for the IFFHS World's Best Goalkeeper of the 21st Century (2001–2011).

International career
Lee was a part of the South Korean national team for the 1994 FIFA World Cup. He was substituted into the game against Germany for main goalkeeper Choi In-young and did not concede a goal in 45 minutes. After the 1994 World Cup, he suffered from tuberculosis and hepatitis and worried that his playing career might end. Luckily, he made a recovery and came back to the national team in 1998.

Lee was selected for Guus Hiddink's squad for the 2002 FIFA World Cup as the first-choice goalkeeper after the rivalry against Kim Byung-ji. He appeared all of seven matches until the third place play-off, and kept three clean sheets against Poland, Portugal and Spain in the tournament. He made the history of South Korean football in the quarter-finals against Spain. After the match was ended without a goal until extra time, Lee blocked Spain's fourth shot taken by Joaquín in the penalty shoot-out. South Korea defeated Spain 5–3 on penalties, becoming the first-ever Asian team to advance to the semi-finals in the World Cup. South Korea finished fourth place in the tournament.

Lee captained South Korea at the 2007 AFC Asian Cup in place of the injured Kim Nam-il. He kept clean sheets in all of South Korea's games in the knockout stage and saved a total of three penalties in shoot-outs (two against Iran and one against Japan). He was selected as the goalkeeper of the All-Star XI. However, he was suspended from the national team for a year, because he sneaked out from his hotel room and went on a drinking binge in an Indonesian bar along with teammates Kim Sang-sik, Woo Sung-yong and Lee Dong-gook before the match against Bahrain, which South Korea lost.

Lee is one of two players (the other being Rigobert Song of Cameroon) to be selected for four World Cups from 1994 to 2010. He is one of seven players from Asia to play in four different World Cups. He played his last game for the national team in a friendly against Nigeria on 11 August 2010 in a 2–1 victory and subsequently retired from international football.

Style of play
Nicknamed the "Spider Hand" in South Korea, Lee is regarded as one of the greatest South Korean goalkeepers of all time. He didn't have good height and rapid pace, but showed great judgment and the harmonies with defenders. He was also noted for his predictive ability and this made him strong on the penalty shoot-out. In shoot-outs of his K League career, he won 92% of matches (11 out of 12) and saved 45% of shots. (26 out of 58)

Career statistics

Club

International

Filmography

Television

Honours
Suwon Samsung Bluewings
K League 1: 1998, 1999, 2004, 2008
Korean FA Cup: 2002, 2009, 2010
Korean League Cup: 1999, 1999+, 2005, 2008
Korean Super Cup: 1999, 2005
Asian Club Championship: 2001–02
Asian Super Cup: 2002
A3 Champions Cup: 2005
Pan-Pacific Championship: 2009

Sangmu FC
Korean Semi-professional Championship: 2001

South Korea U23
Asian Games bronze medal: 2002

South Korea B
Summer Universiade silver medal: 1993
East Asian Games: 1993

South Korea
FIFA World Cup fourth place: 2002
AFC Asian Cup third place: 2000, 2007
EAFF Championship: 2003

Individual
K League 1 Best XI: 1999, 2002, 2004, 2008
EAFF Championship Best Goalkeeper: 2005
AFC Asian Cup Team of the Tournament: 2007
K League 1 Most Valuable Player: 2008
Korean FA Cup Most Valuable Player: 2009
AFC Opta Best XI of All Time (FIFA World Cup): 2020

See also
List of men's footballers with 100 or more international caps

Notes

References

External links

 
 Lee Woon-jae – National Team Stats at KFA 
 
 
 International Appearances & Goals
 Naver Sports Record 

1973 births
Living people
Association football goalkeepers
South Korean footballers
South Korea under-23 international footballers
South Korea international footballers
Suwon Samsung Bluewings players
Gimcheon Sangmu FC players
Jeonnam Dragons players
K League 1 Most Valuable Player Award winners
K League 1 players
1994 FIFA World Cup players
2000 AFC Asian Cup players
2001 FIFA Confederations Cup players
2002 CONCACAF Gold Cup players
2002 FIFA World Cup players
2004 AFC Asian Cup players
2006 FIFA World Cup players
2007 AFC Asian Cup players
2010 FIFA World Cup players
Footballers at the 1992 Summer Olympics
Footballers at the 2000 Summer Olympics
Olympic footballers of South Korea
FIFA Century Club
Sportspeople from North Chungcheong Province
Kyung Hee University alumni
Asian Games medalists in football
Footballers at the 2002 Asian Games
Asian Games bronze medalists for South Korea
Medalists at the 2002 Asian Games
Universiade medalists in football
Universiade silver medalists for South Korea